The United Arab Emirates men's national volleyball team represents United Arab Emirates in international volleyball competitions and friendly matches. The team is currently ranked 65 in the world.

Asian Championship

Asian Games

References

National sports teams of the United Arab Emirates
National men's volleyball teams
Volleyball in the United Arab Emirates